Glen Faki, also known by his stage name Len Faki, is a Turkish-German DJ and producer based in Berlin. Faki is of Turkish descent and is also known under the pseudonym Lamonde. He has appeared as a DJ in clubs such as Ostgut in Berlin, Tresor in Berlin and U60311 in Frankfurt as well as at festivals such as Nature One, SonneMondSterne, Woohah and Alive in Belgium. He made a breakthrough in 2007, when he released the successful tracks "Ik kan niet met deze", "Mekong Delta" and "My Black Sheep".

Career
Faki launched his record label Figure in 2003, and later a sub-label Figure Jams. In 2004, he became resident DJ of Berlin techno club Berghain. In 2006, he launched another label called Podium, which was intended to release EPs. In 2017, he released a remix of Radio Slave's song "Grindhouse".

Selected discography
Source: 
"Rainbow Delta" / "Mekong Delta" (12") (Ostgut Ton, 2007)
Berghain 03 (Mix CD) (Ostgut Ton, 2009)
Edit-Select / Len Faki – Berghain 03 | Part II (12") (Ostgut Ton, 2009)
Basement Trax, Vol. 01 (12") (Ostgut Ton, 2013)
LF & JH – VII (12") (Figure, 2013)
LF & JH – VI  (12") (Figure, 2013)
Len Faki, Markus Suckut – Skulls Ep (12") (Figure, 2014)

References

External links

German DJs
German people of Turkish descent
German techno musicians
Electronic dance music DJs